Hans Karl Friedrich Anton Graf von Diebitsch und Narten (tr. ; 13 May 1785 – 10 June 1831) was a German-born soldier serving as Russian field marshal.

Career 
Hans Karl was educated at the Berlin cadet school, but by the desire of his father, Frederick II's aide-de-camp who had passed into the service of Russia, he also did the same in 1801. He served in the campaign of 1805 against Napoleon and the Grand Armee, and was wounded at Austerlitz, fought at Eylau and Friedland, and after Friedland was promoted captain.

During the next five years of peace he devoted himself to the study of military science, engaging once more in active service in the War of 1812. He distinguished himself very greatly in Wittgenstein's campaign, and in particular at Polotsk (18 and 19 October), after which combat he was raised to the rank of major-general. In the latter part of the campaign he served against the Prussian contingent of General Yorck (von Wartenburg), with whom, through Clausewitz, he negotiated the celebrated convention of Tauroggen, serving thereafter with Yorck in the early part of the German Campaign of 1813.

After the battle of Lützen (1813) he served in Silesia and took part in negotiating the secret treaty of Reichenbach. Having distinguished himself at the battles of Dresden and Leipzig he was promoted lieutenant-general. At the crisis of the campaign of 1814 he strongly urged the march of the allies on Paris; and after their entry the emperor Alexander conferred on him the order of St Alexander Nevsky.

In 1815 he attended the Congress of Vienna, and was afterwards made adjutant-general to the emperor, with whom, as also with his successor Nicholas, he had great influence. By Nicholas he was created baron, and later count. In 1820 he had become chief of the general staff, and in 1825 he assisted in suppressing the Decembrist revolt.

His greatest exploits were in the Russo-Turkish War of 1828–1829, which, after a period of doubtful contest, was decided by Diebitsch's brilliant campaign of Adrianople; this won him the rank of field-marshal and the victory title of Zabalkanski to commemorate his crossing of the Balkans.

In 1830 he was appointed to command the great army destined to suppress the November Uprising in Poland. After the inconclusive battle of Grochow on 25 February, he won the battle of Ostrołęka on 26 May, but soon afterwards died of cholera at Kleszewo near Pułtusk, on 10 June 1831.

References

Further reading
 Chesney, Russo-Turkish Campaigns of 1828–29, (New York, 1856).

1785 births
1831 deaths
People from Oborniki Śląskie
People from the Province of Silesia

Emigrants from the Kingdom of Prussia to the Russian Empire
Russian nobility
Members of the State Council (Russian Empire)
Field marshals of the Russian Empire
Russian Empire commanders of the Napoleonic Wars
Russian Empire people of the November Uprising
Deaths from cholera
Recipients of the Pour le Mérite (military class)
Recipients of the Order of St. George of the First Degree
Knights Cross of the Military Order of Maria Theresa
D